B-SAD is a Portuguese football club from Lisbon founded on 30 June 2018 as an independent entity. A rebel offshoot of Clube de Futebol Os Belenenses, they played four seasons in the Primeira Liga, being relegated to the Liga Portugal 2 for 2022–23. Before changing their name, after the 2021–22 season, they were referred to as Belenenses SAD, officially Os Belenenses – Sociedade Desportiva de Futebol, SAD.

Background and legal status
Historic football club C.F. Os Belenenses created its SAD (Sociedade Anónima Desportiva - Public limited sports company) on 1 July 1999, to run its professional football section. In 2012, with both club and SAD facing enormous financial troubles, club members voted to sell 51% of its SAD to an investor, Codecity, led by Rui Pedro Soares. Added to the stock purchase, a parasocial deal was struck where the founding club could keep special rights, such as veto power over certain SAD decisions and the power to buy its stock back. Also a protocol was agreed upon that would regulate relations between Club and SAD. The club would keep 10% of SAD stocks.

Meanwhile, Codecity terminated the parasocial deal, alleging contractual violations by the Club. In 2017, the Court of Arbitration for Sport deemed the termination of the deal valid, ending the possibility of the Club being able to reacquire the 51% of SAD stocks, in order to regain control of its professional football section.

With tensions mounting between Club and SAD, the protocol that regulated relations between both entities expired on 30 June 2018, ceasing any relationship between both parties. This included the use of Estádio do Restelo (property of the Club) by the SAD's professional football team. Thus was born B-SAD as an autonomous football club, founded on 1 July 2018, after the secession of the SAD from the club. They joined the Lisbon Football Association as member number 1198 (the original Belenenses is member number 64).

Belenenses' historic achievements, such as the victories in the 1945–46 Campeonato Nacional, its 3 Taças de Portugal and 3 Campeonatos de Portugal, solely belong to the Club, since they were won before the creation of the SAD in 1999. The Club created its own football team that started playing in the Lisbon FA regional leagues from 2018–19 season. B-SAD meanwhile claimed the place of the Club in the Primeira Liga. Given that Estádio do Restelo was property of the Club, B-SAD was left without its own stadium. As a consequence, B-SAD started playing home games at the Estádio Nacional in Oeiras, paying rent to the state to use it. 

In October 2018, B-SAD was prohibited from using the name, cross and symbols of the original Belenenses by an intellectual property court decision. As such, after a judicial confirmation of this decision in March 2019, B-SAD presented a new club badge to differentiate itself from the original club. In March 2022, Portugal's Constitutional Court ordered B-SAD to pay over €30,000 in compensation to C.F. Os Belenenses for the youth development of the player Nilton Varela.

In May 2022, B-SAD reached an agreement to rent the Estádio das Seixas from Lisbon Football Association District League team Atlético Malveira in Malveira, Mafra. The landlord club denied rumours that the two teams were going to merge.

Footballing history
Under manager Silas, B-SAD played its first game on 28 July 2018, a 3–1 home win over U.D. Oliveirense with Fredy scoring the first goal. The team's first Primeira Liga game was a win at C.D. Tondela on 11 August with the only goal coming from the same player. In February 2019, due to a temporary unavailability of the Estádio Nacional, B-SAD rented Estádio do Bonfim, around sixty kilometres away in Setúbal, for two home games. The game against Moreirense F.C. at this ground on 4 February was attended by 298 spectators, the lowest in the history of the league.

Silas was dismissed in September 2019, being replaced by under-23 manager Pedro Ribeiro, who quit in January with the team one point above the relegation positions. Former Portugal international Petit replaced him, reaching the quarter-finals of the Taça de Portugal in 2020–21, where the team were eliminated 3–1 by S.L. Benfica. 

On 19 October 2021, having needed a goal in the last minute of extra time to defeat minnows Berço SC in the cup, Petit resigned with eight months of his contract remaining. The team had earned four points and no wins in the first eight games of the league campaign. In November, under his replacement Filipe Cândido, the team fielded just 9 available players including two goalkeepers in a league match against Benfica, due to an outbreak of Omicron variant. This resulted to a 7–0 loss at halftime and the match was eventually abandoned in the early minutes of the second half. This caused lots of controversy as many people believed the game should have been postponed due to the Covid-19 outbreak affecting the Belenenses SAD squad. Youth manager Franclim Carvalho was promoted to the first team in January as the third manager of a season that ended in relegation to the second tier with a last place finish in the first tier.

League and cup history

Players

Current squad

Out on loan

See also
Milton Keynes Dons F.C.
CSA Steaua București (football)

Notes

References

 
Football clubs in Portugal
Football clubs in Lisbon
Association football clubs established in 2018
2018 establishments in Portugal